The Pratt & Whitney PW1000G, also called the GTF (geared turbofan), is a high-bypass geared turbofan engine family produced by Pratt & Whitney.

After many demonstrators, the program was launched with the PW1200G on the Mitsubishi SpaceJet (later cancelled) in March 2008, first flight tested in July 2008.
The first variant to be certified was the PW1500G for the Airbus A220 in February 2013.
The program cost is estimated at $10 billion.

The gearbox between the fan and the low-pressure spool allows each to spin at its optimal speed, allowing a higher bypass ratio for a better propulsive efficiency.
Pratt & Whitney claims the engine is 16% more fuel efficient than the previous generation, and up to 75% quieter.

The first variant to enter service was the PW1100G for the Airbus A320neo in January 2016. The engine had teething problems after its introduction, extending to grounded aircraft and inflight failures, solved afterwards.

The variants can generate 15,000 to 33,000 lbf (67 to 147 kN) of thrust.
The engine is used on the A220, A320neo family, Embraer E-Jet E2 and Irkut MC-21

Development

Precursors
In summer 1993 Pratt & Whitney started to test its  Advanced Ducted Propulsor (ADP) demonstrator at the NASA Ames wind tunnel, using a 4:1,  gearbox.
Its  fan with 18 reversing pitch composite blades had a 15:1 bypass ratio.
While the gearbox and larger fan weighed more, this was mitigated by using 40% composites by weight, up from 15%.

P&W first attempted to build a production geared turbofan starting around 1998, with the PW8000, targeted for the  range. This was an upgrade of the existing PW6000 that replaced the fan section with a gear box and a new single-stage fan, and aimed for 8–10% lower operating costs, or $600,000 per aircraft annually.

The PW8000 had an 11:1 bypass ratio (twice that of the V2500), a 40:1 overall pressure ratio, and 13 compressor stages instead of the 22 in the V2500 for similar thrusts.
Preliminary development was to end by June 1, the first test for 10 months later, and certification 20 months after, for $400 million.
Pratt had tested gearboxes for 950 hours for $350 million in the previous decade and aimed for 99.5% efficiency.
The ADP gearbox was 30% more powerful and the reversing pitch fan was not retained for the PW8000.
Pratt was to control 60% of the program, shared with IAE partners MTU and FiatAvio but not Rolls-Royce, and possibly with Volvo and MHI.

The  fan had 20 titanium blades, and moved  of air per second in climb.
The conventional 3-stage  compressor was followed by a 5-stage, 12:1  compressor fitted with 700 blades inspired by the military  program's low aspect-ratio airfoils.
A floatwall/TALON combustor was followed by a single stage HP turbine and a counter rotating 3-stage LP turbine with 400 blades, both computational fluid dynamics (CFD) optimized.
The gearbox could handle . Eight engines would have been used for certification.
After several years, the PW8000 project was abandoned.

Soon afterwards the ATFI project appeared, using a PW308 core but with a new gearbox and a single-stage fan. It had its first run on March 16, 2001. This led to the Geared Turbofan (GTF) program, which was based around a newly designed core jointly developed with German MTU Aero Engines.

Geared turbofan (GTF)

After the budget of NASA on aeronautics research was severely cut at the start of 2006, Pratt & Whitney committed to spend $100 million a year on the geared turbofan (GTF) development for the next generation of single-aisle airliners, focused on the  thrust range.
By then, P&W was supporting 36% of the engines in the Western-operated commercial fleet, compared to CFM’s 33% (growing), GE’s 13%, Rolls-Royce’s 11%, and IAE’ 6% (growing); but it was decreasing as it was mostly based on the older JT8D.
The company was hoping the GTF could cut fuel burn by up to 12% and noise by 31dB compared with then-current engines.
P&W was planning a ground engine demonstration in late 2007, aimed at  thrust with a 2 m (80 in)-diameter fan.
The first ground test of the demonstrator was performed in November 2007 at West Palm Beach, Florida.

In October 2007, the GTF was selected to power the 70- to 90-seat Mitsubishi Regional Jet (MRJ).
In March 2008, Mitsubishi Heavy Industries launched the MRJ with an order for 25 aircraft from All Nippon Airways, then targeting a 2013 entry into service.
In July 2008, the GTF was renamed PW1000G, the first in a new line of "PurePower" engines.

Flight testing

The engine was first tested on the Pratt & Whitney Boeing 747SP on July 11, 2008 through mid-August 2008, totaling 12 flights and 43.5 flight hours. It then flew starting October 14, 2008 on an Airbus A340-600 in Toulouse on the number two pylon.

Testing of the CSeries bound PW1524G model began in October 2010.
In addition to the geared turbofan, the initial designs included a variable-area fan nozzle (VAFN), which allows improvements in propulsive efficiency across a range of the flight envelope. However, the VAFN has since been dropped from production designs due to high system weight. The PW1500G engine achieved Transport Canada type certification on February 20, 2013.
The first flight test on one of its intended production airframes, the Bombardier CSeries (Airbus A220), was on September 16, 2013.

The A320 engine, the PW1100G, had made its first static engine test run on November 1, 2012, and was first tested on the 747SP on May 15, 2013.
The first flight of the Airbus A320neo followed on September 25, 2014. The PW1100G engine achieved FAA type certification on December 19, 2014.

The fourth variant of the engine, the PW1900G for the Embraer E2, first flew on November 3, 2015 from Mirabel in Canada fitted to the Boeing 747SP test aircraft.

Production 

The program cost is estimated at $10 billion.
The list price was $ million in 2011.
At the start of its production in 2016, each GTF was costing PW $10m to build, more than the sale price, but should become less than $2m per engine. MTU provides the first four stages of the high-pressure compressor, the low-pressure turbine and other components. In October 2016, MTU started to deliver the engine assembled on its line to Airbus.

In November 2016, Pratt had fixed the issue of engine start time and wanted to deliver 150 powerplants by the year-end, 50 fewer than originally planned. This was because of low yield of fan blades when less than one-third were passing inspection at the start of the year compared to 75% success for the latest. 350–400 engine deliveries were targeted for 2017. Fuel-burn performance was 16% better than the IAE V2500 baseline, on target, and even 18% better in best cases.

The troubled introduction led to customers choosing the CFM LEAP, which won 396 A320neo orders compared to 39 for the GTF from January through early August 2017: 46% of the GTF-powered A320neos were out of service for at least one week in July 2017 compared with just 9% of those using the LEAP. The GTF's market share fell from 45% to 40% in 2016, but 1,523 planes (%) were still undecided, and as of August 2017 Pratt had an 8,000 engine orderbook including 1,000 non-Airbus planes. 

On 24 October 2017, a 99.8% dispatch reliability was attained and Pratt remained on track to deliver 350 to 400 engines in 2017, as 254 have been delivered including 120 in the third quarter, but 12–15% were diverted for spares as the carbon air seal and combustor liners were wearing out quickly, requiring engine removals to change the part.
P&W expects to deliver over 2,500 GTFs from 2018 to 2020, more than 10,000 engines by 2025.

After 15 PW1200Gs for the Mitsubishi MRJ development were built in Mirabel and Middletown, Mitsubishi Heavy Industries started final assembly in Nagoya in mid 2018 for the MRJ 2020 introduction.
Icing, thermal environment, stall, drainage, performance, operability and other development tests were completed.
MHI manufactures the combustor and high-pressure turbine disks.
The first engine was completed by November 2019.

Ultra high-bypass version 

In 2010, Pratt & Whitney launched the development of an ultra high-bypass version, with a ratio significantly higher than the PW1100G's 12.2:1 for the A320neo, to improve fuel consumption by 20% compared to a CFM56-7 and reduced noise relative to the FAA's Stage 4 by 25 dB.
In 2012, wind tunnel tests were completed on an earlier version of the fan and in 2015, 275h of testing were completed on a fan rig.
More than 175h of ground testing of key components were completed in October 2017, on a shorter duct inlet, a part of the nacelle and a fan with lower-pressure ratio blades, significantly fewer than the 20 blades of the PW1100G.
The US FAA Continuous Lower Energy, Emissions and Noise (CLEEN) program sponsors the tests, with its technologies to be validated in a flight test campaign.
It could power the Boeing New Midsize Airplane in the mid-2020s and Airbus' response, and would compete against the Rolls-Royce UltraFan and a CFM LEAP higher-thrust version.

GTF Advantage 

In December 2021, Pratt & Whitney announced an updated GTF Advantage version of the A320neo's PW1100G available from 2024, after over a year of ground and flight testing.
It offers 1% more fuel efficiency, more durability and more thrust with 34,000 lbf (151 kN), up to 8% more than before at hot and high airports.
This is achieved through more flow into the core; a tweaked active clearance control between the turbine and seals, a reduction of temperature in the high-pressure compressor; improved, more durable coatings and more damage-resistant blisk rotors.
Some improvements could trickle down to the other variants.

Design

By putting a 3:1 gearbox between the fan and the low-pressure spool, each spins at its optimal speed: 4,000–5,000 RPM for the fan and 12,000–15,000 RPM for the spool, the high-pressure spool spinning at more than 20,000 RPM.
The PW1431G variant has a compression ratio of 42.
As the geared fan is slower, the tensile stresses on the blades are reduced, allowing high-strength aluminum alloys.
The A320 PW1100G fan has 20 blades, down from 36 in the CFM56-5B.

Pratt & Whitney claims the PW1000G is 16% more fuel efficient than current engines used on regional jets and single-aisle jets, as well as being up to 75% quieter.
As the higher bypass ratio and gear leverage a higher propulsive efficiency, there is less need for a high performance engine core than the CFM LEAP, leaving a larger fuel burn gain margin of 5–7% over the next decade, averaging 1% per year combined with gear ratio tweaks.
The PW1400G has a cruise Thrust-specific fuel consumption of  

The  gearbox is designed as a lifetime item with no scheduled maintenance other than changing oil.
It has up to 25,000 cycles s, 25% better than others at 20,000 cycles, reducing maintenance costs, while the fan gear has no limit. The fan drive gear system (FDGS) is expected to stay on wing for 30,000 flight hours or more before it needs its first overhaul.

Operational history

Introduction 

The first delivery to a commercial operator, an A320neo to Lufthansa, occurred on January 20, 2016. 
It entered commercial use later that month.
As of early August 2017, Pratt was supporting 75 aircraft: 59 Airbus A320neos with PW1100Gs and 16 Airbus A220s with PW1500Gs.
In January 2018, it reached 500,000 flight hours on a fleet of 135 aircraft flown by 21 operators.
Due to teething problems, overall losses on the GTF program rose to $1.2 billion.

In May 2018, after receiving and operating five A320neos, Spirit Airlines confirms a fuel burn reduction better than the 15% promised, perhaps by 1%–2%.
Air Lease Corporation's A320neos deliveries are 11 months late but its executive chairman Steven Udvar-Hazy believes 12–18 months will be needed to get back to normal.
On 17 July 2018, Pratt & Whitney announced that the PW1500G had been granted ETOPS 180 approval by the FAA.

Starting times 

The first delivery was to Lufthansa instead of Qatar Airways due to rotor bow, or thermal bowing, due to asymmetrical cooling after shut-down on the previous flight. Differences in temperature across the shaft section supporting the rotor lead to different thermal deformation of the shaft material, causing the rotor axis to bend; this results in an offset between the center of gravity of the bowed rotor and the bearing axis, causing a slight imbalance and potentially reducing the tight clearance between the rotor blade tips and the compressor wall. All production standard engines now feature a damper on the third and fourth shaft bearings to help stiffen the shaft and data from engines in service and under accelerated testing is expected to gradually reduce engine start times. According to P&W President Bob Leduc, "by the time we get to June (2016), it will be down to 200 seconds for start time and by the time we get to December (2016) we will be down to 150 seconds for start time".

In an earnings briefing on 26 July the CEO of Pratt & Whitney's parent company United Technologies Gregory Hayes stated when asked about the start up issues on the PW1100G-JM; "On the technical stuff, I would tell you it is in the rearview mirror. The start time with the software drops have been pretty well addressed". Airbus group chief Tom Enders said while releasing Airbus's 2016 first half financial results that the first upgraded "golden engine" would be delivered to Lufthansa in early August 2016.

Initially, the PW1000G start up sequence took about seven minutes, compared to one to two and a half minute startups on the similar CFM56 and IAE V2500 engines; hardware fixes and software upgrades decreased the time required by a little over a minute, and cooling down both engines at the same time saved slightly over two minutes, for a total reduction of three and a half minutes. These modifications were included on new-build engines, as well as retrofitting existing units. Pratt & Whitney continued to improve start up times, with fuel-nozzle modifications and oil filling procedure changes expected to save another minute when introduced by the end of 2017.

To create a better seal and reduce cooling time by 1 min, a cubic boron nitride coating was applied to the 11 integrally bladed rotors  tips: the A321neo production engines start times will be similar to the V2500.

Engine removals 

As IndiGo and Go Air operate in a humid, hot, polluted and salty environment, 42 engines were prematurely removed from those companies' aircraft by 24 February, with more removals scheduled, after warnings, mandatory checks, and possible repairs were due after only three flight hours instead of ten. 28 engine removals were due to an air seal leakage in the third bearing, which allowed metal particles to enter the oil system, triggering detectors. Pratt & Whitney discovered these issues in 2015 and revised the design in 2016 after the 160th engine with improved bearing compartments and damping for the third and fourth bearings to offset the rotor-bow, with the repairs retrofitted on-wing after testing at Airbus and Pratt. Boosting durability of the third bearing compartment air seal, the upgraded carbon seal package was certified on April 12 and can be retrofitted over a typical night stop.

Thirteen engine removals were due to borescope inspections revealing blocked cooling holes in combustion chamber panels, apparently due to saltier air, and Pratt & Whitney developed and tested a more durable combustor design to address a tone problem, to be introduced in September.
Spirit Airlines reported that the bleed air system froze shut on occasion due to cold temperatures on four of its five A320neos, a problem also experienced by IndiGo, leading Spirit to impose a  ceiling on their aircraft.
To avoid troubles with the P&W1100G engines, JetBlue Airways switched its first three Airbus A321neos in 2018 to A321ceos, deferring delivery of its first A321neos to 2019 among its order for 60.

In 2017, IndiGo had to ground seven planes, two in May, four in June and one in July after, their engines out of service, waiting for upgrades: a lack of spare parts—grounding also All Nippon Airways and Hong Kong Express Airways A320s—has been compounded by a new Indian tax on goods and services impeding imports.
With removals without sufficient spare engines available, the airline had to ground as many as nine jets on some days, operations disruptions are understood by Pratt & Whitney which struggles to fix glitches and sent compensation while design changes could take a year and sorting out the issue one and a half years.
Indigo had to replace 69 engines from mid 2016 till early 2018.

Knife edge seal 

In February 2018, after in-flight failures of PW1100G with its high pressure compressor aft hub modified – apparently problems of its knife edge seal, the EASA and Airbus grounded some A320neo family aircraft until they are fitted with spares. Later, Airbus decided to stop accepting additional PW1100G engines for A320neo aircraft.
Despite the part failure that could hold up engine deliveries to Airbus until April, P&W reaffirmed its 2018 delivery goal of doubling its 2017 rate of 374 engines as nearly 100 engines delivered to Airbus are problematic, including 43 in service.

To solve the issue, a revised configuration with a mature and approved design will be released from early March engine deliveries.
The EASA and FAA imposed flying A320neos with mixed engines and forbid ETOPS, but the Indian DGCA went further and grounded all A320neo with an affected engine.
The design flaw will cost Pratt & Whitney $50 million to resolve.
P&W will replace the seals in the 55 engines delivered to Airbus and in the 43 in-service GTFs, as the target of 750 deliveries in 2018 seems more remote.

Engine vibrations

By September 2018, the A320neo's PW1100Gs were experiencing increasing engine vibrations, sometimes before 1,000 flight hours and mostly at high power settings in the climb phase, requiring an early engine change.
Lufthansa's A320neos were grounded 254 days since first delivery, 13 times worse than for its A320ceos, 78% of the time due to engine issues as 14 unplanned engine changes were made. In September 2018 its A320neos utilization was half of its A320ceos.
By the end of November, Airbus planned to explain the root cause and give an in-depth analysis by the end of 2018.
Pratt & Whitney stated the A220's and Embraer E2's PW1500G/PW1900Gs are free from the issue and that less than 2% of PW1100Gs are affected while  GTF-powered A320/A321neos have been delivered.

This engine family experiences also a high-energy resonance in its burning chambers at low power on a specific RPM, leading to a characteristic "Whale song" on taxiing operations and generates a few loud sound events up to 12dB(A) above normal operation noise levels on landing approach about 10 miles from the touchdown.

By October 2018 about 10 P&W-powered A320neos were typically grounded for repairs at any given time.
On 21 January 2019 an IndiGo flight returned to the airport shortly after takeoff after the pilot observed high vibration in one of its PW1100G-JM engines.

Excessive corrosion
Pratt & Whitney has reduced life limits on PW1500G (installed on the Airbus A220) and PW1900G (installed on Embraer E190/E195-E20) high-pressure compressor front hubs after corrosion was discovered during routine engine overhaul. This corrosion reduces the low-cycle fatigue capability and may lead to cracking before the component reaches its life limit.

In-flight failures

PW1100G failures 
Indian airline IndiGo reported four incidents involving in-flight engine stall during climb followed by shutdown, which occurred on the 24th, 25th and 26 October 2019. The cause of the shutdowns has been traced to problems with the Low-Pressure Turbine (LPT). On 1 November 2019 the Indian Directorate General of Civil Aviation (DGCA) asked IndiGo to replace engines on all of the 98 A320 Neo airplanes it currently operates by January 31, 2020 and suggested to defer future deliveries until the existing fleet is re-engined. Later DGCA extended the deadline to May 31, 2020.

PW1500G failures 

On 13 October 2018, a Swiss A220 engine was shutdown after a faulty O-ring seal on the engine’s fuel oil cooler led to a loss of oil pressure.

On 25 July 2019, an Airbus A220-300 of Swiss International Air Lines had an engine inflight shutdown (IFSD) and diverted to Paris–Charles de Gaulle. 
The low-pressure compressor of its PW1500G disintegrated while climbing through 32,000 ft.

On 16 September 2019, a similar accident happened just before reaching 35,000 ft and the crew returned to Geneva. The inspection has shown that "stage-one rotor in the low-pressure compressor had separated and there was a hole in the compressor case".
On September 26, 2019 the FAA issued an Airworthiness Directive mandating borescope inspections on the engines.

On 15 October 2019, another engine failed and the crew diverted to Paris-Charles de Gaulle, Swiss withdrew its fleet for inspection. Swiss returned some aircraft to flight status the same day after engine checks and planned to restore flight operations by 17 October.
A software update may cause damaging vibrations of fast-moving parts, causing the failures.

After those engine failures, Transport Canada issued an emergency airworthiness directive limiting the power to 94% of N1 above , disengaging the autothrottle for the climb over this altitude before engaging it again in cruise. 
For the PW1500G, N1 is the Low Pressure Spool, with a nominal speed of 10,600 RPM, with the fan geared with a ratio of 1:3.0625 (nominal speed  RPM).
The top of climb is the most demanding point aerodynamically for a turbofan, where the compressor spins the fastest.
The directive states that "high altitude climbs at higher thrust settings for engines with certain thrust ratings" may be a contributor to the failures, and cautions that "this condition, if not corrected, could lead to an uncontained failure of the engine and damage to the aeroplane".
The EASA adopted the directive, and others are expected to follow.

The engines involved in the July and September incidents had 154 and 230 cycles, respectively, while the October failure occurred to an engine with 1,654 cycles since new but within 300 cycles after an electronic engine-control update. Pratt & Whitney recommends inspections on engines with up to 300 cycles after the update.

Another PW1500G suffered an uncontained engine failure, on 12 February 2020 aboard A220-300 belonging to Air Baltic during flight BT-677 from Riga, Latvia to Malaga, Spain 
Following these Airbus A220 PW1500G failures, the similar PW1900G electronic control software was upgraded for the Embraer E195-E2.

Applications

Airbus A220: PW1500G (exclusive)
Airbus A320neo: PW1100G
 Embraer E-Jet E2 family : PW1700G & PW1900G  (exclusive)
 Mitsubishi SpaceJet: PW1200G (exclusive)
 Irkut MC-21: PW1400G

It has been proposed for the Sukhoi Superjet 130, and the Rekkof Aircraft .

Specifications

See also

References

External links

 
 
 
 
 
 
 
 
 
 
 

High-bypass turbofan engines
PW1000G
2000s turbofan engines
Geared turbofan engines